The Old Bakery, Manor Mill & Forge is a collection of buildings in Branscombe, Seaton, Devon, England. The property has been in the ownership of the National Trust since 1965.

The property consists of three buildings: a bakery, a watermill and a forge.

The Old Bakery is a stone-built and partially rendered thatched building. It was the last traditional working bakery in the county when it closed its doors in 1987. The old baking equipment has been preserved in the baking room and the rest of the building now serves as a tea room.

The water-powered Manor Mill probably supplied the flour for the bakery. The mill has recently been restored and is now in full working order.

The Forge is the only thatched forge surviving in England. The blacksmith sells the ironwork he produces.

External links
Branscombe – The Old Bakery, Manor Mill & Forge information at the National Trust

National Trust properties in Devon
Mill museums in England
Museums in Devon
Industrial archaeological sites in Devon
Watermills in Devon